"Doamne, ocrotește-i pe români" is a Romanian patriotic song. In August 1988, poet Adrian Păunescu composed a politically sensitive version first performed on stage in 1990, following the Romanian Revolution which overthrew the Romanian communist government. A parody of the song with xenophobic lyrics against Hungarians also exists and was played in 2018 during a match between Juventus București and Sepsi OSK Sfântu Gheorghe on a stadium of the former. Both had members of Romania's Hungarian minority. "Doamne, ocrotește-i pe români" was also sung by ethnic Romanians during an ethnic incident between Hungarians and Romanians in Valea Uzului in 2019. The lyrics of the song are the following:

The tune of the song is derived from another march sung during the Hungarian–Romanian War known as "Marseilleza românilor ardeleni" or "La Dealul Sătmarului". The melody of this march was continued by "Doamne, ocrotește-i pe români" although with different lyrics. The original lyrics of this march are as follows:

References

External links
 

Romanian patriotic songs
Songs of World War I
Romanian-language songs